Tiko Air is an airline based in Antananrivo, Madagascar. It operates charter services within Madagascar.

History

The airline was established in 2000 by the Tiko Holding Company (owned by the Ex-President of Madagascar, Marc Ravalomanana) and Air Madagascar. The airline commenced operations in July 2001.

Fleet

Current fleet
As of November 2010 the Tiko Air fleet includes:

1 ATR 42-320 - registered 5R-MJT (previously registered as 5R-TIK)

Former fleet

1 Casa CN-235-10- registered 5R-MKM until June 2006

References

Airlines of Madagascar
Airlines established in 2000
Companies based in Antananarivo
2000 establishments in Madagascar